Epiphryne verriculata, the cabbage tree moth,  is a moth in the family Geometridae. It is found only in New Zealand, and only feeds on the native cabbage tree (Cordyline australis); its wings are patterned to camouflage it against dead cabbage tree leaves.

Taxonomy
E. verriculata was first described by Baron Cajetan von Felder, Rudolf Felder & Alois Friedrich Rogenhofer in 1875 under the name Cidaria verriculata.

Distribution and habitat 
This moth is endemic to New Zealand and is very common, being widely distributed throughout the country. Its favoured habitats are wetland and native forest, but it can be found in urban parks and gardens, as cabbage trees are commonly grown in cultivation.

Life cycle

Eggs 
The eggs of E. verriculata are bright green and are laid on the underside of leaves in neat parallel rows in autumn and spring. As they mature the eggs change colour from bright green to brown and then finally to red. After approximately 14 days the eggs hatch and the caterpillars emerge.

Larva 
The caterpillar is green with red and dark brown lines. When fully grown it is approximately 2.5 cm long. At night caterpillars feed on the new and unopened leaves of Cordyline australis; their flattened bodies allow them to squeeze in amongst the developing leaves. The caterpillars create a characteristic pattern of damage, initially making holes and dark channels along the leaf and, as they grow, notches in the leaf edge. As the leaf opens and grows the notches likewise grow and become more noticeable. The larvae reach 25 mm in length before pupating, either on the cabbage tree in crevices or dead leaf bases or on the ground underneath.

Adult 
The wingspan of the adult moth is about 40 mm. Adults can be seen from spring to late summer (October to May). E. verriculata have light brown wings with parallel horizontal stripes that resemble the veins in dead cabbage tree leaves; the moth sits with its body perpendicular to the leaf's long axis and wings pressed up against the leaf, its markings lining up with the veins. If disturbed, the will only fly a short distance before finding another dead brown leaf to settle on, avoiding the green fresh leaves. Although attracted to light, the adult moth is inconspicuous when resting by day on cabbage tree leaves, and this camouflage helps protect it from predators.

Conservation status 
Epiphryne verriculata is common throughout New Zealand and not regarded as threatened.

References

External links 

 The cabbage tree moth discussed on RNZ Critter of the Week, 26 January 2018

Larentiinae
Moths of New Zealand
Endemic fauna of New Zealand
Moths described in 1875
Taxa named by Rudolf Felder
Taxa named by Alois Friedrich Rogenhofer
Endemic moths of New Zealand